The 2003 Estoril Open was a tennis tournament played on outdoor clay courts at the Estoril Court Central in Oeiras in Portugal that was part of the International Series of the 2003 ATP Tour and of Tier IV of the 2003 WTA Tour. The tournament ran from 7 April until 13 April 2003. Nikolay Davydenko and Magüi Serna won the singles title.

Finals

Men's singles

 Nikolay Davydenko defeated  Agustín Calleri 6–4, 6–3
 It was Davydenko's 2nd title of the year and the 2nd of his career.

Women's singles

 Magüi Serna defeated  Julia Schruff 6–4, 6–1
 It was Serna's 1st title of the year and the 3rd of her career.

Men's doubles

 Mahesh Bhupathi /  Max Mirnyi defeated  Lucas Arnold /  Mariano Hood 6–1, 6–2
 It was Bhupathi's 1st title of the year and the 27th of his career. It was Mirnyi's 3rd title of the year and the 16th of his career.

Women's doubles

 Petra Mandula /  Patricia Wartusch defeated  Maret Ani /  Emmanuelle Gagliardi 6–7(3–7), 7–6(7–3), 6–2
 It was Mandula's 1st title of the year and the 4th of her career. It was Wartusch's 1st title of the year and the 7th of her career.

External links
 Official website
 ATP Tournament Profile
 WTA Tournament Profile

2003 Estoril Open